Wayne Grubb (born July 19, 1976) is a former NASCAR driver and now a crew chief for GC Motorsports International. He ran 52 NASCAR Busch Series races and 7 Craftsman Truck Series races before he retired late in the 2000 season. He is the older brother of former NASCAR driver Kevin Grubb, who died on May 6, 2009 at age 31.  Grubb was born in Mechanicsville, Virginia.

Busch Series Career 
In 1997, Wayne made some laps as he was getting ready for a Rookie of the Year run in 1998. His debut came at New Hampshire International Speedway, driving his family-owned to 35th on the starting grid. He was making his way through the field in his #83 Chevy, but an engine failure put him 36th on the final rundown.
He ran at South Boston Speedway next, finishing 25th with engine problems, despite his first top-10 qualifying effort of 8th. His potential showed, however, when after qualifying 31st at Indianapolis Raceway Park, he drove through the field, led 28 laps, and finished 5th, his first career top-10 finish.

In 1998, Wayne had a decent rookie run. He had an average start of 17.8 and an average finish of 22.5. Wayne secured his best weekend of his career when he secured his first career pole in the spring race at Richmond International Raceway. He led 3 laps in that race, and finished a career-best 4th place. Wayne also finished 7th at Bristol Motor Speedway. He also had an outside pole at South Boston and a 5th place qualifying effort at New Hampshire to his credit. However, he often DNQed and the budget was tight, only competing in half the races and finishing 36th in the points.

In 1999, Wayne had a disappointing year. He had no top-10 runs or qualifying efforts. He only ran 17 of 32 races. His average start was 28th and average finish of 31st. Once again, his best weekend of the year came at Richmond in September. He qualified and finished in 15th. He had two other top-20 runs: 15th at Gateway and 17th at South Boston. He ended 45th in points

Things did not get any better in 2000. His average finish was 29th. Even with an 8th place start at IRP and a 5th place at Darlington, Wayne finished his Busch Series career at Darlington with a 32nd-place finish. He gave the car over to Brandon Butler, watched his team finish out 2000, and then dismantled it due to lack of sponsorship before 2001. Wayne ran 15 races in 2000 and finished 40th in points.

In his Busch Series career, Wayne had one pole, 2 top-5s, 3 top-10s and his best finish in a race was 4th (Richmond 1998). His best points finish was 1998 in 36th.

Craftsman Truck Series 
Before Wayne was racing in the Busch series, he was actually making some races in the Craftsman Truck Series, driving the #4 Chevy in 7 races during 1996 and 1997.

He made his debut in the 1996 race at Richmond. He qualified a solid 13th, but became involved in an accident, and he finished that race a disappointing 32nd. Wayne also ran in 1996 at Martinsville, finishing a solid 18th after starting deep in the pack. This would end up being his best Craftsman Truck finish.

After those two races in 1996, Wayne added 5 more to his resume in 1997. He finished 36th at New Hampshire, 27th twice at Louisville and Martinsville, 23rd at Richmond, and a 22nd at Fontana. He finished the year 49th in points.

Motorsports career results

NASCAR
(key) (Bold – Pole position awarded by qualifying time. Italics – Pole position earned by points standings or practice time. * – Most laps led.)

Busch Series

Craftsman Truck Series

References

External links
 

1976 births
Living people
NASCAR crew chiefs
NASCAR drivers
People from Mechanicsville, Virginia
Racing drivers from Virginia